Caldo tlalpeño is a chicken and vegetable soup in Mexican cuisine which contains chicken meat, and chickpeas, carrots, and green beans, submerged in a chicken broth with garlic and onion, seasoned with epazote, cumin and chipotle chili. It is served with avocado slices and diced cheese, and accompanied with lime.

See also 
 List of Mexican dishes
 List of soups
Mexican cuisine

References

Mexican soups
Mexican chicken dishes
Chickpea dishes
Chicken soups